Candace Nelson (born May 8, 1974) is an Indonesian-born pastry chef and judge on the television series Cupcake Wars and Sugar Rush.

Early life
Nelson grew up in Indonesia. Baking runs in her family, as her French-American grandmother was known for the desserts she created at her San Francisco restaurant in the 1930s. Nelson is a graduate of Groton School (class of 1991), Wesleyan University (class of 1996), and Tante Marie's Professional Pastry Program in San Francisco. Nelson is a Wesleyan Distinguished Alumnus Award recipient.

Before entering the bakery business, Nelson and her husband, Charles (born 1969), a native of Oklahoma, worked as investment bankers. After the dot-com bust, Nelson decided to focus on pastry making and opened a custom cake business from her home in San Francisco. Later she and Charles moved the business to a former old-fashioned sandwich shop in Los Angeles and began making only cupcakes.

Sprinkles Cupcakes

On April 13, 2005, the couple opened Sprinkles Cupcakes, the world's first cupcake bakery. They started in a -shop in Beverly Hills, California. Though the bakery business was in a four-year no carb slump and early naysayers, they sold 2,000 cupcakes the first week. Nelson is described as having a "sophisticated" take on the classic cupcake, using finest quality ingredients like sweet cream butter, pure Nielsen-Massey Madagascar Bourbon vanilla and Callebaut chocolate. She also creates offbeat offerings like vegan and gluten-free cupcakes and even cupcakes for dogs. The sleek, minimalistic store was designed by an architect from Vienna and the logo and packaging were recreated by a former Martha Stewart employee.

Sprinkles now has 22 locations throughout the United States including New York, with plans to open in 4 more cities including London and Tokyo. The Nelsons also started a traveling "Sprinklesmobile", a Mercedes Sprinter van designed by Sprinkles architect Andrea Lenardin. In 2007, Nelson also developed a line of cupcake mixes which are sold exclusively through her store and Williams Sonoma stores in the United States and Canada. In 2012, Sprinkles introduced its Cupcake ATM, a  contactless cupcake delivery system, which Nelson conceived after a late night pregnancy craving. Sprinkles now operates 38 Cupcake ATMs nationwide. Sprinkles fans include Oprah Winfrey, Blake Lively, Katie Holmes, Ryan Seacrest, Tom Cruise, Barbra Streisand, and Serena Williams.

In 2014, Nelson sold Sprinkles to a private equity group.

Television career

Nelson is a judge on the competition series Cupcake Wars, syndicated around the world, and Sugar Rush, which she executive produced. She has also appeared on The Best Thing I Ever Ate, The Chef Show, and has been a judge on Bobby Flay's Throwdown show. Nelson also has been featured on television shows, including The Today Show, Nightline, The Martha Stewart Show, Masterchef Season 10 and profiled in People magazine. Her cupcakes have been featured by The Oprah Winfrey Show, Bon Appetit magazine, Food & Wine, The New York Times and the Los Angeles Times.

Nelson co-created and is executive producer of the forthcoming pizza cooking competition Best in Dough on Hulu.

Pizzana 
Nelson is co-founder of Pizzana, a Neo-Neapolitan pizza restaurant chain.

Author 
Nelson is the author of The Sprinkles Baking Book and Sweet Success.

Personal life 
Nelson resides in Los Angeles, California, and Sun Valley, Idaho. Her Sun Valley home was featured on Elle Decor.

References

External links
 

Living people
Wesleyan University alumni
Pastry chefs
1974 births
Groton School alumni
American women restaurateurs
American restaurateurs
American cookbook writers
American television producers
Women cookbook writers